Ray Isaac may refer to:
Ray Isaac (American football), American football quarterback
Ray Isaac (singer), Australian singer

See also
Isaac Ray, American psychiatrist